Punsand is a coastal locality in the Shire of Torres, Queensland, Australia.

Geography
The locality of Punsand includes the north-western edge of the tip of Cape York Peninsula, as well as several of the surrounding Torres Strait islands: Possession Island, Great Woody Island, Little Woody Island, Meddler Island and Quoin Island.

References 

Shire of Torres
Coastline of Queensland
Localities in Queensland